Construction delays are situations where project events occur at a later time than expected due to causes related to the client, consultant, and contractor etc. In residential and light construction, construction delays are often the result of miscommunication between contractors, subcontractors, and property owners. These types of misunderstandings and unrealistic expectations are usually avoided through the use of detailed critical path schedules, which specify the work, and timetable to be used, but most importantly, the logical sequence of events which must occur for a project to be completed. Delays in construction projects are frequently expensive, since there is usually a construction loan involved which charges interest, management staff dedicated to the project whose costs are time dependent, and ongoing inflation in wage and material prices.

However, in more complex projects, problems will arise that are not foreseen in the original contract, and so other legal construction forms are subsequently used, such as change orders, lien waivers, and addenda. 

In construction projects, as well in other projects where a schedule is being used to plan work, delays happen all the time. It is what is being delayed that determines if a project, or some other deadline such as a milestone, will be completed late. 

Before analyzing construction delays, a clear understanding of the general types of delays is necessary. There are four basic ways to categorize delays:

 Critical or Non-Critical
 Excusable or Non-Excusable
 Concurrent or Non-Concurrent
 Compensable or Non-Compensable

Before determining the impact of a delay on the project, one must determine whether the delay is critical or non-critical. Additionally, all delays are either excusable or non-excusable. Both excusable and non-excusable delays can be defined as either concurrent or non-concurrent. Delays can be further broken down into compensable or non-compensable delays. 

Moreover, the construction supply chain plays a major role in the construction market competition. Construction supply chain management assists enterprises by helping to improve competitiveness, increase profits and have more control over the different factors and variables within the project. A. Cox  and  P. Ireland contributed the myriad of construction supply chain which illustrated the main flows within the construction supply chain. In his research, Ghaith Al-Werikat analysed delays in relation to the myriad of construction supply chain. In particular, material flow, equipment flow, information flow, labour flow and client's information flow, offering a quantification of the impact of supply chain delays on construction projects performance. On the other hand, Economic historian Robert E. Wright argues that construction delays are caused by bid gaming, change order artistry, asymmetric information, and post contractual market power. Until those fundamental issues are confronted and resolved, many custom construction projects will continue to come in over budget, past due, or below contract specifications, he claims.

See also
Construction
Civil engineering
Project planning

References

Further reading

External links 
 Construction Risk.com Resource for information on latest trends in project delays and construction claims
  Article outlining the different types of weather delays

Building engineering